Bhavina Hasmukhbhai Patel is an Indian parathlete and table tennis player from Mehsana, Gujarat. She won a silver medal in Class 4 Table tennis at the 2020 Summer Paralympics in Tokyo.

Career 
Patel has won a number of medals in national and international competitions. She reached the World Number 2 ranking by winning the silver medal for India in the individual category at the 2011 PTT Thailand Open. In October 2013, Patel won the silver medal in the women's singles Class 4 at the Asian Para Table Tennis Championships in Beijing. In 2017, Patel won the bronze medal in Bhavina won the bronze medal in the Asian Para Table Tennis Championships held in Beijing, China.

In the Tokyo 2020 Paralympics, she reached the semi-finals after defeating Borislava Rankovic and won the silver medal after being defeated by Zhou Ying. She is coached by Lalan Doshi and is guided by team official, Tejalben Lakhia. Patel also works with the Employees' State Insurance Corporation (ESIC) in Ahmedabad, India.

In the 2022 Birmingham Commonwealth Games, she won a gold medal in the women's singles class 3–5.

Awards 
Arjuna Award (2021)

References

External links
International Table Tennis Federation Para Table Tennis
Table Tennis on International Paralympic Committee website

Living people
Indian female table tennis players
Gujarati people
Year of birth missing (living people)
Sportswomen from Gujarat
Racket sportspeople from Gujarat
People from Mehsana district
Table tennis players at the 2020 Summer Paralympics
Medalists at the 2020 Summer Paralympics
Paralympic medalists in table tennis
Paralympic silver medalists for India
Paralympic table tennis players of India
Table tennis players at the 2022 Commonwealth Games
Commonwealth Games medallists in table tennis
Commonwealth Games gold medallists for India
Recipients of the Arjuna Award
Medallists at the 2022 Commonwealth Games